Statistical Office of Montenegro or MONSTAT is the statistics agency of Montenegro. It provides information service and indicators for monitoring the economic and social development of Montenegro, and regularly publishes publications compiling figures about the country.

References

External links

Montenegro
Demographics of Montenegro
Government of Montenegro